Fossalta di Piave is a town in the Metropolitan City of Venice, Veneto, Italy. It is southeast of E70.

The town's approximately 4,126 inhabitants make their living in tourism and in the wine industry.

References

Cities and towns in Veneto